Sidnei dal Rovere (born 20 March 1959) is a Brazilian boxer. He competed in the men's featherweight event at the 1980 Summer Olympics.

References

1959 births
Living people
Brazilian male boxers
Olympic boxers of Brazil
Boxers at the 1980 Summer Olympics
Sportspeople from São Paulo
Featherweight boxers